Guido Pella was the champion in 2013, but did not qualify for the event in 2013, since he played mostly ATP World Tour tournaments in that season. Filippo Volandri has won the tournament by defeating Alejandro González 4–6, 6–4, 6–2 in the final. For the third consecutive year since the tournament's inception, the finalists played a rematch of their previous round-robin stage encounter, in which the champion was defeated by the runner-up.

Seeds

  Teymuraz Gabashvili (semifinals)
  Filippo Volandri (champion)
  Aleksandr Nedovyesov (semifinals)
  Jesse Huta Galung (round robin)
  Alejandro González (final)
  Adrian Ungur (round robin)
  Andrej Martin (round robin)
  Guilherme Clezar (round robin)

Draw

Finals

Green group
Standings are determined by: 1. number of wins; 2. number of matches; 3. in two-players-ties, head-to-head records; 4. in three-players-ties, percentage of sets won, or of games won; 5. steering-committee decision.

Yellow group
Standings are determined by: 1. number of wins; 2. number of matches; 3. in two-players-ties, head-to-head records; 4. in three-players-ties, percentage of sets won, or of games won; 5. steering-committee decision.

References
Main Draw

Finals
2013 Singles
2013 in Brazilian tennis